Ahmed Iqbal Haider is a Bangladeshi theatre director. As of 2012, he directed a total 56 plays . He serves as the Artistic Director of Theatre Institute Chittagong (TIC). In 2021, he was awarded Ekushey Padak from the Government of Bangladesh for his contribution to drama.

Career
Haider debuted in theatre in 1975. He is the team leader of Tirjak Natyadal, a theatre troupe based in Chittagong, Bangladesh.

Haider is  the organising secretary of International Theater Institute Bangladesh Chapter and participated as a Bangladeshi representative in 31st, 32nd and 33rd ITI World Congress.

Works
 Bishorjon (by Rabindranath Tagore)
 Rathjatra (by Rabindranath Tagore)
 Raktokarobi (by Rabindranath Tagore)
 Raja (by Rabindranath Tagore)
 Dakghar (by Rabindranath Tagore)
 Merchant of Venice (by William Shakespeare)
 Oedipus (by Sophocles)
 Madhumala (by Kazi Nazrul Islam)
 Buro Shalikher Gharey Rown (by Michael Madhusudan Dutta)
 Dwarruddha (by Jean Paul Sartre)
 Atotayi (by Selim Al Deen) 
 Smriti: '71 (by Zia Haider)
 Tarangobhango (by Syed Waliullah)
 Swat (by Mamunur Rashid)

References

Living people
Recipients of the Ekushey Padak
Bangladeshi theatre directors
Place of birth missing (living people)
Date of birth missing (living people)
Year of birth missing (living people)